Joseph Maximilian Mueller ( – August 9, 1981) was an American prelate of the Roman Catholic Church. He served as bishop of the Diocese of Sioux City in Iowa from 1948 to 1970.

Biography

Early life 
Joseph Mueller was born on December 1, 1894, in St. Louis, Missouri, to George Fritz and Barbara (née Ziegler) Mueller. After graduating from SS. Peter and Paul School at St. Louis in 1907, he studied at the Pontifical College Josephinum in Columbus, Ohio.

Priesthood 
Mueller was ordained to the priesthood for the Diocese of Belleville on June 14, 1919. He then served as a curate at parishes in Carlyle, Mount Carmel, East St. Louis, and Belleville, all in Illinois. In 1926, Mueller was appointed the founding pastor of Blessed Sacrament Parish in Belleville. From 1930 to 1947, he served as rector of St. Peter's Cathedral Parish in Belleville. He was named a domestic prelate in 1939.

Coadjutor Bishop and Bishop of Sioux City 
On August 20, 1947, Mueller was appointed coadjutor bishop of the Diocese of Sioux City and titular bishop of Sinda by Pope Pius XII. He received his episcopal consecration on October 16, 1947, from Archbishop Amleto Cicognani, with Bishops Joseph Schlarman and Edward Hunkeler serving as co-consecrators. 

On the death of Bishop Edmond Heelan on September 20, 1948, Mueller automatically succeeded him as the third bishop of Sioux City8. As bishop, Mueller built several new schools, churches, and other parish facilities. He also attended all four sessions of the Second Vatican Council in Rome between 1962 and 1965.

Retirement and legacy 
On October 20, 1970, Pope Paul VI accepted Mueller's resignation as bishop of the Diocese of Sioux Falls and appointed him as titular bishop of Simitthu. He resigned his titular see on January 13, 1971. 

Joseph Mueller died on August 9, 1981, in Sioux City at age 86.

References

1894 births
1981 deaths
Pontifical College Josephinum alumni
Clergy from St. Louis
Roman Catholic Diocese of Belleville
American people of German descent
20th-century Roman Catholic bishops in the United States
Participants in the Second Vatican Council
Roman Catholic bishops of Sioux City